Tinea columbariella is a moth belonging to the family Tineidae. The species was first described by Wocke in 1877.

It has a cosmopolitan distribution.

Description
Wingspan 9-15 mm. Head with rust brown hair. Antennae just over half the front wing length. The forewings dark grey-brown with a black spot on the disc and a basal hyaline spot. Hindwings light grey. Difficult to distinguish from Tinea pellionella, Tinea dubiella and  Tinea svenssoni but the genitalia are diagnostic.

Biology
Flies at night (and comes to light) from June to August. Found indoors in lofts, barns, stables and the like. The case-bearing larva is whitish with a dark head and feeds on nesting material or feathers in birds nests.

References

Gaedike,R. 2019  Tineidae II : Myrmecozelinae, Perissomasticinae, Tineinae, Hieroxestinae, Teichobiinae and Stathmopolitinae Microlepidoptera of Europe, vol. 9. Leiden : Brill, [2019] 
Petersen, G., 1957: Die Genitalien der paläarktischen Tineiden (Lepidoptera: Tineidae). Beiträge zur Entomologie 7 (1/2): 55–176.

External links
Swedish moths
Lepiforum de

Tineinae
Moths described in 1877
Taxa named by Maximilian Ferdinand Wocke
Cosmopolitan moths